The 1949 All-American Girls Professional Baseball League season marked the seventh season of the circuit. With the Chicago Colleens and Springfield Sallies turning into rookie development teams after the 1948 season, the AAGPBL was left with eight squads: the Kenosha Comets, Fort Wayne Daisies, Grand Rapids Chicks, Muskegon Lassies, Peoria Redwings, Racine Belles, Rockford Peaches and South Bend Blue Sox. The teams competed through a 112-game schedule.

This time the league adopted a smaller ball during the midseason, from 10⅜ inches to 10 inches, while the pitching distance increased 50 feet to 55 feet. The transition toward traditional baseball  increased significantly. As a result, some talented pitchers jumped up to the rival Chicago National League when they could not adapt to the overhand delivery adopted the previous season. Pitching still outweighed hitting in the league, as no hitter could top the .300 average mark for the year. Rockford's Lois Florreich collected a 0.67 earned run average and South Bend's Jean Faut had a .909 winning percentage, both all-time single season records, while South Bend's Lillian Faralla hurled two no-hitters and Faut added another one for the team.

The greatest highlight of the season came from Muskegon's pitcher/outfielder Doris Sams, who won the batting crown with a .279 average and posted a 15–10 record with a 1.58 ERA, to become the first player in league history to win two Player of the Year Awards. She obtained her first distinction in the 1947 season.

The South Bend team finished tied in first place along with Rockford. In the first round of the Shaughnessy playoffs, third place Grand Rapids and sixth place Muskegon won their respective best-of-three series against fifth place Fort Wayne and fourth place Kenosha. In the second round, Rockford defeated South Bend in a best-of-seven series and Rockford won over Grand Rapids in a best-of-five series to determine the championship, which was won by Rockford in the final best-of-five series.

The AAGPBL peaked in attendance during the 1947 and 1948 seasons, when the teams attracted almost a million paid fans for consecutive year. But for the first time, the league failed to reach the attendance desired since its foundation in 1943.

Standings

Postseason

Batting statistics

Pitching statistics

All-Star Game

See also
1949 Major League Baseball season
1949 Nippon Professional Baseball season

Sources

External links
AAGPBL Official Website
AAGPBL Records
Baseball Historian files
The Diamond Angle profiles and interviews
SABR Projects – Jim Sargent articles
YouTube videos

All-American Girls Professional Baseball League seasons
1940s in women's baseball
1949 in baseball
All